Stephen Logan may refer to:

 Stephen Logan (The Bold and the Beautiful), a character on The Bold and the Beautiful
 Stephen T. Logan (1800–1880), American lawyer and politician